The following is a list of Great White North segments from 1980-1982. The characters of Bob and Doug McKenzie first appeared in the first episode of SCTV'''s third season.

Series overview

Season 3 (1980-1981)
The Great White North segments featured one two-minute sketch per episode. Production took place after hours at SCTV, where several segments would be filmed at once. Of the segments produced, twenty-five were aired during the third season.

Key
 In the # column the number refers to the order of appearance.
 In the № column the number refers to the episode number.

{| class="wikitable plainrowheaders"
|-
|-style="color:white"
!! style="background-color: #2E5B73;"| #
!! style="background-color: #2E5B73;"| Skit Name
!! style="background-color: #2E5B73;"| SCTV Episode
!! style="background-color: #2E5B73;"| DVD Release
!! style="background-color: #2E5B73;"| Original Airdate
!! style="background-color: #2E5B73;"| №

|}

Season 4, Cycle 1 (1981)
Most of this cycle was made up of Great White North repeat segments. The only new appearances were in episodes 4/1-2 and 4/1-9. The final episode of the season included a wraparound storyline which heavily featured the characters.
{| class="wikitable plainrowheaders"
|-
|-style="color:white"
!! style="background-color: #AE1C26;"| #
!! style="background-color: #AE1C26;"| Skit Name
!! style="background-color: #AE1C26;"| SCTV Episode
!! style="background-color: #AE1C26;"| DVD Release
!! style="background-color: #AE1C26;"| Original Airdate
!! style="background-color: #AE1C26;"| №

|}

Season 4, Cycle 2 (1981-1982)
Growing in popularity, the characters returned for 9 new segments in the second cycle of season 4. While Cycle 1 featured many repeats, this is the only cycle to feature a new Great White North segment in each episode.
{| class="wikitable plainrowheaders"
|-
|-style="color:white"
!! style="background-color: #5E4080;"| #
!! style="background-color: #5E4080;"| Skit Name
!! style="background-color: #5E4080;"| SCTV Episode
!! style="background-color: #5E4080;"| DVD Release
!! style="background-color: #5E4080;"| Original Airdate
!! style="background-color: #5E4080;"| №

|}

Season 4, Cycle 3 (1982)
This was the last season to feature the characters. The first episode's plot revolves around the growing popularity of Bob and Doug and they are given their own variety show on SCTV, which turns into a catastrophe. The characters are then featured in four final segments before Rick Moranis and Dave Thomas left SCTV to film Strange Brew.
{| class="wikitable plainrowheaders"
|-
|-style="color:black"
!! style="background-color: #FBEC5D;"| #
!! style="background-color: #FBEC5D;"| Skit Name
!! style="background-color: #FBEC5D;"| SCTV Episode
!! style="background-color: #FBEC5D;"| DVD Release
!! style="background-color: #FBEC5D;"| Original Airdate
!! style="background-color: #FBEC5D;"| №

|}

 See also Strange BrewBob & Doug McKenzie's Two-Four AnniversaryBob & Doug (2009 TV series)SCTVBrother BearCanadian English
Beer in Canada
HoserThe Red Green ShowTrailer Park Boys''

References 

Bob and Doug McKenzie